Margaret Elizabeth Ball (born November 7, 1947) is an American author of science fiction, fantasy, and historical novels. Under the pseudonym of Catherine Lyndell, she has also written romance. Ball has a B.A. in mathematics and a Ph.D. in linguistics from the University of Texas. A former Fulbright scholar and UCLA professor, she devotes her time to fabric arts and embeadery. Married with two children, she lives in Austin, Texas.

Bibliography

Tamai Series
 Flameweaver (1991)
 Changeweaver (1993)

Acorna series (contributor)
 Acorna: The Unicorn Girl (1997) (with Anne McCaffrey)
 Acorna's Quest (1998) (with Anne McCaffrey)

Brainship series
 Partnership (1992) (with Anne McCaffrey)
 Brain Ships (omnibus) (2003) (with Mercedes Lackey and Anne McCaffrey)

Chicks in Chainmail series
 "Career Day" (1995) in Chicks in Chainmail
 Mathemagics: A Chicks in Chainmail Novel (1996)
 "Tales from the Slushpile" (1998) in Did You Say Chicks?!
 "Fun with Hieroglyphics" (2000) in The Chick is in the Mail

Other works

Novels 
  The Shadow Gate (1990)
 A Bridge to the Sky (1990)
 No Earthly Sunne (1994)
 Lost in Translation (1995)
 Disappearing Act (2004)
  Duchess of Aquitaine (2007)

Short stories

External links

 Entry at SF Encyclopedia
 
 
 Entry at Fantastic Fiction
 Etsy Profile

20th-century American novelists
21st-century American novelists
American science fiction writers
American women short story writers
American women novelists
Women science fiction and fantasy writers
University of Texas at Austin College of Liberal Arts alumni
University of California, Los Angeles faculty
Living people
1947 births
20th-century American women writers
21st-century American women writers
20th-century American short story writers
21st-century American short story writers